Agenda with Cito Beltran is a Philippine television talk show broadcast by One News, hosted by Cito Beltran. It premiered on May 28, 2018. It airs every weekdays at 8:00 AM (PST).

The program was also aired on TV5 via same-day delayed telecast at 10:30 PM, later moved as next-day broadcast at 6:00 AM. Due to COVID-19 pandemic, the show's broadcast on TV5 went on-hiatus and later removed on the network's programming.

Host
 Cito Beltran

Segments
 Opening Shot
 Experts and Pros
 TLC: Tweets, Likes, & Comments
 Today's Agenda

See also
 One News
 Straight from the Shoulder

References

External links
  (on 5)

One News (TV channel) original programming
TV5 (Philippine TV network) news shows
Philippine television talk shows
2018 Philippine television series debuts
English-language television shows